Professor Richard James Gilbertson  is a paediatric oncology clinician scientist and a Senior Group Leader at the Cancer Research UK Cambridge Institute, University of Cambridge. He is  the Li Ka Shing Chair of Oncology, and Director of the CRUK Cambridge Major Centre and the Children's Brain Tumour Centre of Excellence.

Education 
Gilbertson attended Medical School at Newcastle University, graduating with Bachelor of Medical Science, Bachelor of Medicine, Bachelor of Surgery degrees in 1992. He went on to complete his PhD in 1998 as an MRC Clinical Training Fellow with Professors Andrew Pearson and John Lunec before becoming an MRC Clinical Scientist in 1998.

Career and research 
Gilbertson's research focuses on understanding the link between normal development and the origins of cancer, with a particular focus on children's brain tumours. He has shown that clinically distinct subtypes of childhood medulloblastoma and ependymoma arise within different lineages of developing brain and are driven by distinct mutations in their DNA. His work has also shown that a combination of stem cell mutagenesis and extrinsic factors that enhance the proliferation of progenitor cell populations across multiple organs ultimately determines organ cancer risk.

In 2000, Gilbertson joined the St Jude Children's Research Hospital. There, he became the founding director of the Molecular Clinical Trials Core and the co-leader of the Neurobiology and Brain Tumor Program. In 2011, he was named executive vice president of St. Jude and director of its Comprehensive Cancer Centre. In 2014 he was also appointed Scientific Director of St. Jude Children's Research Hospital.

In 2015, he returned to the UK as the Li Ka Shing Chair of Oncology, head of the Department of Oncology, senior group leader at the Cancer Research UK Cambridge Institute at the University of Cambridge and Director of the CRUK Cambridge Major Centre.

He was elected: Fellow of the Academy of Medical Sciences (FMedSci) in 2017; Fellow of the European Academy of Cancer Sciences in 2017; and Fellow of the Royal Society of London (FRS) 2022. His certificate for election to Fellow of the Royal Society (FRS) in 2022 reads:

 A paediatric oncology clinician scientist, Richard has pioneered the field of cross-species genomics, deploying data generated from patients to identify the lineage origins of childhood brain tumours; build accurate models of these cancers; and design new treatments. He has also generated organism-wide maps of cancer risk across all organs and ages, helping to understand the relative contributions of cell lineage, gene mutation and tissue damage to tumourigenesis.

Awards and honours 
 International Society of Pediatric Oncology Schweisguth Prize, 1998
 Royal College of Paediatrics and Child Health SPARKS Young Investigator of the Year, 2000
 British Paediatric Neurology Association Ronnie McKeith Prize, 2002
 Brain Tumor Society Sydney Schlobohm Leadership Chair of Research, 2006
 Malia's Cord Foundation Harold C. Schott Research Chair, 2008
 American Association of Neurological Surgeons Hunt-Wilson Lectureship, 2011
 Elected to the American Society for Clinical Investigation, 2013
 Member, Faculty of 1000
 Elected Fellow of the Academy of Medical Sciences, 2017
 Elected Fellow of the European Academy of Cancer Sciences 2017
 Elected Fellow of the Royal College of Physicians 2020
 Elected Fellow of the Royal Society 2022
 Society of Memorial Sloan Kettering Prize, 2022
 Elected Fellow of EMBO 2022

References

Year of birth missing (living people)
Living people
Alumni of Newcastle University
Cancer researchers
English oncologists
Fellows of St John's College, Cambridge
Fellows of the Royal Society
Fellows of the Academy of Medical Sciences (United Kingdom)
Fellows of the Royal College of Physicians